Ajay Singh may refer to:

 A. K. Singh (Ajay Kumar Singh, born 1953), Indian army officer and politician
 Ajay Singh (Karnataka politician) (born before 1992), Indian politician from the state of Karnataka
 Ajay Singh (diplomat) (1950–2020), high commissioner of India to Fiji
 Ajay Arjun Singh (active 2008), Indian politician from the state of the Madhya Pradesh
 Ajay Singh (footballer) (born 1989), Indian footballer
 Ajay Singh (weightlifter) (born 1997), Indian weightlifter
 Ajay Singh (entrepreneur) (active from 2005), owner of SpiceJet
 Ajay Singh Kilak, Indian minister co-operation in the Second Raje ministry
 Ajay Kumar Singh (disambiguation), various people
 Ajay Pratap Singh, Indian politician
 Ajay Raj Singh (born 1978), Indian sprinter